Alison Bell may refer to:
Alison Bell (actress) (born 1978), Australian actor
Alison Bell (journalist) (born 1966), English journalist and radio presenter
Alison Bell (politician), Hong Kong politician
Alison Bell (bowls) (born 1983), Northern Irish lawn bowler
Alison Bell (field hockey) (born 1984), Scottish field hockey player
Alison M. Bell, American scientist
Alison Bell, chancellor of WGU Indiana